The American Samoa national football team represents the country of American Samoa in international association football. It is fielded by Football Federation American Samoa, the governing body of football in American Samoa, and competes as a member of the Oceania Football Confederation (OFC), which encompasses the countries of Oceania. American Samoa played their first international match on 20 August 1983 in a 3–1 loss to Western Samoa in Apia.

American Samoa have competed in numerous competitions, and all players who have played in at least one international match, either as a member of the starting eleven or as a substitute, are listed below. Each player's details include his playing position while with the team, the number of caps earned and goals scored in all international matches, and details of the first and most recent matches played in. The names are initially ordered by number of caps (in descending order), then by date of debut, then by alphabetical order. All statistics are correct up to and including the match played on 18 July 2019.

Introduction
The appearance record is held by goalkeeper Nicky Salapu. His last match for American Samoa was a match against Tahiti on 18 July 2019 in the Pacific Games, with American Samoa career summarizing on 22 caps.

The goalscoring record is held by Ramin Ott, with 3 goals in 15 matches, scored between 2007 and 2015. He set the record with his 3rd goal on 2 September 2015, in a 2–0 win over Tonga in a FIFA World Cup 2018 qualifier.

Key

Players

References

American Samoa international footballers
Association football player non-biographical articles